Duchess of Palma de Mallorca was a substantive title granted by King Juan Carlos I of Spain on 26 September 1997 to his younger daughter, Infanta Cristina of Spain, on the occasion of her forthcoming marriage to Iñaki Urdangarin. On 11 June 2015, she was stripped of her dukedom by King Felipe VI, her younger brother, due to a corruption inquiry, and the dukedom was merged again in the Spanish Crown.

Dukes of Palma de Mallorca 
 Infanta Cristina of Spain, and His Excellency Don Iñaki Urdangarin as her consort (4 October 1997 – 11 June 2015).

Heir 
 The right to the use of the title was granted only to Doña Cristina; it was a Royal House title, not a hereditary title of the nobility.

See also 
 Palma de Mallorca, a major city and port on the island of Majorca.

References

External links 
 Real Decreto 1502/1997, de 26 de septiembre, por el que se concede, con carácter vitalicio, la facultad de usar el título de Duquesa de Palma de Mallorca a Su Alteza Real la Infanta Doña Cristina (BOE núm. 232, de 27 de septiembre de 1997). 
 Real Decreto 470/2015, de 11 de junio, por el que se revoca la atribución a Su Alteza Real la Infanta Doña Cristina de la facultad de usar el título de Duquesa de Palma de Mallorca (BOE núm. 140, de 12 de junio de 2015).